The 2015–16 season is Zamalek Sports Club 105th season of football since existence in 1911, 60th consecutive season in the Egyptian Premier League, the top flight in the Egyptian football. The club also play in the CAF Champions League, after winning the 2014–15 Egyptian Premier League.

Team kit
The team kits for this season are manufactured by Macron.

Players

Squad information

Egyptian Football Association (EFA) rules are that a team may only have 3 foreign born players in the squad. 
The Squad Has 25 Players Registered as Professionals and 5 Players Registered (-U23) and 2 Players of the Youth academy

Out on loan

Transfers

Players in

Total expenditure: $3.9 million

Players out

Total revenue:$2.7M

Net income:  $1.2M

Statistics

Goal scorers

Competitions

Overall

Overview
{| class="wikitable" style="text-align: center"
|-
!rowspan=2|Competition
!colspan=8|Record
|-
!
!
!
!
!
!
!
!
|-
| Premier League

|-
| Egypt Cup

|-
| Champions League

|-
| Egyptian Super Cup

|-
! Total

Egyptian Super Cup

Egyptian Premier League

League table

Results summary

Results by round

Matches

Results overview

Egypt Cup

CAF Champions League

First round

Second round

Group stage

Knockout stage

Final

Summary

References

Zamalek SC seasons
Zamalek